The United Nations Secretariat Building is a skyscraper within the headquarters of the United Nations in the Turtle Bay neighborhood of Manhattan in New York City. It contains the offices of the United Nations Secretariat, the executive organ of the United Nations (UN). It was designed by a group of architects led by Wallace Harrison. Although the building is located within the United States, the site is under UN jurisdiction, so the building is exempt from some local regulations.

The wider western and eastern elevations of the facade are glass curtain walls, while the narrower northern and southern elevations are made of marble. The Secretariat Building contains  of space. The lowest stories contain press offices, staff rooms, and other functions. The Secretariat offices are placed on the upper stories, which were originally arranged in a modular layout. The building also contains various pieces of artwork. The building's style has inspired the construction of other glass curtain wall buildings in Manhattan.

The design process for the United Nations headquarters formally began in February 1947, and a groundbreaking ceremony for the Secretariat Building occurred on September 14, 1948. Staff started moving into the building on August 21, 1950, and it was completed in June 1951. Within a decade, the Secretariat Building was overcrowded, prompting the UN to build additional office space in the area. The building started to deteriorate in the 1980s due to a lack of funding, which was worsened by the fact that it did not meet modern New York City building codes. UN officials considered renovating the building by the late 1990s, but the project was deferred for several years. The Secretariat Building was renovated starting in 2010, and it reopened in phases from July to December 2012.

Site 
The Secretariat Building is part of the headquarters of the United Nations in the Turtle Bay neighborhood of Manhattan in New York City. It occupies a land lot bounded by First Avenue to the west, 42nd Street to the south, the East River to the east, and 48th Street to the north. Although it is physically within the United States, the underlying land is under the jurisdiction of the United Nations (UN). The site is technically extraterritorial through a treaty agreement with the US government, though it is not a territory governed by the UN. Most local, state, and federal laws still apply within the UN headquarters. Due to the site's extraterritorial status, the headquarters buildings are not New York City designated landmarks, since such a designation falls under the purview of the New York City Landmarks Preservation Commission.

The Secretariat Building is directly connected to the Conference Building (housing the Security Council) at its northeast, as well as the Dag Hammarskjöld Library to the south. In addition, it is indirectly connected to the United Nations General Assembly Building to the north, via the Conference Building. West of the Secretariat Building is a circular pool with a decorative fountain in its center, as well as a sculpture executed in 1964 by British artist Barbara Hepworth in memory of Secretary-General Dag Hammarskjöld. The Japanese Peace Bell is just north of the building, and a grove of sycamore trees is planted next to the Secretariat Building. On the western part of the site, along First Avenue, are the flags of the UN, its member states, and its observer states.

Outside of the UN headquarters, Robert Moses Playground is directly to the south, and Tudor City and the Ford Foundation Center for Social Justice are to the west. In addition, the Millennium Hilton New York One UN Plaza hotel (within One and Two United Nations Plaza) are to the northwest. The building is physically isolated from other nearby structures, with the nearest New York City Subway station being several blocks away. Because of this, the Secretariat Building appears as a freestanding tower.

Historically, the site was part of a cove called Turtle Bay. The cove, located between what is now 45th and 48th Streets, was fed by a stream that ran from the present-day intersection of Second Avenue and 48th Street. A creek from the southern end of modern-day Central Park also drained into Turtle Bay. The first settlement on the site was a tobacco farm built in 1639. The site was developed with residences in the 19th century. Slaughterhouses operated on the eastern side of First Avenue for over a hundred years until the construction of the United Nations headquarters. The UN purchased the site in 1946 under the sole condition that it could never slaughter cattle on the land.

Architecture
The Secretariat Building was designed in the International Style by a team of ten architects working under planning director Wallace K. Harrison. The Board of Design comprised N. D. Bassov of the Soviet Union; Gaston Brunfaut of Belgium; Ernest Cormier of Canada; Le Corbusier of France; Liang Seu-cheng of China; Sven Markelius of Sweden; Oscar Niemeyer of Brazil; Howard Robertson of the United Kingdom; G. A. Soilleux of Australia; and Julio Vilamajó of Uruguay. Abel Sorenson was the interior designer. In addition, David Fine of United States Steel oversaw the construction of the Secretariat Building. The building houses the administrative functions of the UN, including day-to-day duties such as finance and translation. It contains three basement levels and 39 above-ground stories.

Form and facade 
The Secretariat's architects had wanted to design the massing as a slab without any setbacks. This contrasted with older buildings, such as those at the Rockefeller Center complex, which contained setbacks corresponding to the tops of their elevator banks.

The cornerstone of the UN headquarters was dedicated at the Secretariat Building in 1949. The name of the United Nations is inscribed in English, Spanish, French, Russian, and Chinese, which at the time were the five official languages of the United Nations. The cornerstone was originally intended to be relocated to the General Assembly Building when that building was completed. UN officials ultimately decided to permanently affix the stone to a high pedestal next to the Secretariat Building.

Curtain walls 

The wider western and eastern elevations of the facade consist of glass curtain walls set within a metal grid. The Secretariat Building was the first skyscraper in New York City to use a glass curtain wall. The western and eastern elevations contain 5,400 windows in total. The original curtain wall was a single layer of blue-green glass that absorbed heat. The reflective glass was chosen largely as a means to reduce heat on the western elevation, which absorbed most of the sunlight during a typical workday. The eastern elevation was clad in the same material for aesthetic reasons. The modern facade, installed in 2010, is made of low emissivity glass that resembles the original facade. The modern curtain wall contains two layers of glass panes, which are more resistant to shattering in case of a bombing.

The original curtain walls were cantilevered  from the building's superstructure and were attached to the concrete floor slabs. Each of the original windows were aluminum sash windows, separated by aluminum mullions that projected slightly from the facade. The sash windows were compatible with conventional window cleaning equipment. The modern curtain walls are hung from the superstructure via outrigger plates, and they contain projecting aluminum mullions similar to those on the original sash windows. Three of the original curtain-wall panels are preserved in the Museum of Modern Art.

The windows on different stories are separated by spandrel panels. The inner faces of the spandrels are painted black, insulating the building while also giving the impression of depth. The curtain walls originally contained weep holes, which were intended to prevent the windows from cracking. Most of the weep holes were plugged in 1952 and 1953 because the building's shape and its susceptibility to high winds frequently caused rainwater to leak into the building.

Floors 6, 16, 28, and 39 contain pipe galleries rather than glass panels, since these stories include mechanical equipment. The facades of these mechanical stories consist of latticed panels, except on floor 39, where there is a mechanical penthouse behind an open-air grille. The architect Henry Stern Churchill wrote that the mechanical penthouse was "a very simple shape and could very well have been left visible".

Marble slabs 
The narrower northern and southern elevations are made of masonry clad with Vermont marble. These elevations rise as unbroken slabs and do not contain any openings. The building's steel superstructure, including steel bracing, was concealed within these marble slabs. According to Harrison, the marble walls not only allowed the Secretariat Building to be seen as a monument, but also reduced competition between staff members who wanted corner offices.

Structural features 
The foundation includes concrete piers that extend down to the underlying bedrock. Each set of pilings was then covered by a concrete cap.

The columns of the superstructure are arranged in a 10×3 grid. The narrow central bay was used as an elevator core. The floors are generally made of mesh and reinforced concrete, which is covered by either terrazzo, cement, asphalt-tile, or carpeting. Electrical and air ducts are placed underneath each floor slab. The interior partition walls are made of rough masonry, marble, plaster, glass, aluminum, or pointed steel.

Interior 
Floors 6, 16, and 28 are used as mechanical floors, and floor 39 serves as a mechanical penthouse, accessible only by stairs. In addition, the United Nations headquarters contained a pneumatic mail system, with tubes connecting to a central collection point in the Secretariat Building. There was also a dumbwaiter that stopped at every floor except for the lobby and the mechanical stories. The pneumatic mail system only served two stories, while the conveyor belt and dumbwaiter systems were primarily used by the building's messenger stations, which occupied only eleven stories. The building is decorated with various pieces of art from the United Nations Art Collection.

The Secretariat Building was built with 21 high-speed passenger elevators and eight bronze-and-glass escalators. The building has three banks of six passenger elevators, as well as two freight elevators serving all stories. The low-rise, mid-rise, and high-rise banks of elevators respectively serve floors 2–15, 16–27, and 28–39. The elevators were programmed so that, if a person on one of the office floors was waiting for a "down" elevator for more than 60 seconds, they would instead be able to enter the next "up" elevator. The elevators were initially staffed by elevator operators before being converted to manual operation in 1967.

Lower stories 

Under the building is a three-story garage for UN employees, with 1,500 parking spaces. The first basement level also contains the UN's post office and a studio for educational films. The second basement level contains lockers for maintenance workers and a room for printing and collating documents. The third basement level includes a small firehouse for the UN headquarters and a furnace room, as well as a document distribution room in the third basement. One of the basement levels contains the radio department of United Nations Department of Public Information. Tunnels from the basements lead south to the library and north to the General Assembly Building.

The building's lobby contains black-and-white terrazzo floors, as well as columns covered with green Italian marble. There are full-height windows within the lobby. In addition, the lobby contains Peace, a  stained glass window by Marc Chagall, dedicated in memory of Hammarskjöld in 1964. When the building was constructed, the lowest stories were to contain broadcasting studios, press offices, staff rooms, and other functions. Media correspondents for the United Nations occupied floors 2 to 4. There was a meditation space on floor 2 that doubled as a press conference room. In addition, there was a bank branch on floor 4. The fourth and fifth floors were connected by an open stairway.

Floor 5 contained employee amenities, including a health clinic and a passageway to a staff dining room above the adjacent Conference Building. The dining room was originally supposed to be an open-air terrace facing the East River, but it was partially enclosed due to pollution from a nearby power plant. The dining room frequently hosted parties and receptions for UN staff before being converted into offices in 1981. Floor 7 contained a large telephone switchboard for the UN's Information Office. The switchboard, installed by the New York Telephone Company, was originally designed to accommodate 3,000 lines, though it could be expanded to as many as 8,000 lines.

Offices 
The offices were placed on the upper floors. There were private offices on the perimeter of each floor. Secretarial offices, support staff, and elevator cores were clustered in the middle of each story. Low-level officials worked on the shallower western side of the building, while high-level officials worked on the eastern side. This was done for two reasons: the eastern side of the building was more desirable because it faced the East River, and higher-level diplomats needed space for secretaries, filing cabinets, and other space. Throughout the late 20th century, the original layout of the offices was changed. The partitions originally reached from the floor to the ceiling, but they were replaced with half-height partitions in 2010, when each story was converted into an open plan space.

Floor 17 contained an interpreters' lounge and the UN's art and cartography divisions, while floor 20 contained an in-house barber shop. Floor 38 contained offices and an apartment for the Secretary-General of the United Nations. In addition, floor 38 contained a private switchboard and an office for the President of the United Nations General Assembly; most Secretariat employees were not allowed to visit this story.

Originally, the offices included French desks as well as aluminum chairs. Some of the original furnishings were restored in 2010, while others were replaced with replicas. Each ceiling contains lighting fixtures spaced at regular intervals, which are outfitted with egg-crate louvers to reduce glare. The ceilings slope up near each window. Each office had a set of Venetian blinds, allowing occupants to adjust natural light levels as necessary; there were 2,200 Venetian blinds in total.

The Secretariat Building contained an air-conditioning system with 4,000 individual sets of controls. This system not only reduced cooling costs by at least 25 percent, but also allowed delegates and staff to customize the temperatures of their own offices. Offices within  of a window are cooled by high-velocity air conditioning units underneath the windows. For offices near the center of the building, cool air is delivered through low-velocity units in the ceilings. The cool air was provided by a pair of centrifugal compressors, which could collectively generate 2,300 tons of air. There are hot-water heating units beneath the windows, within the north and south walls of the building, and underneath the floor slab of the first story; in addition, there are steam heaters in the pipe galleries. The use of East River water precluded the need for a dedicated cooling tower, which would have required increasing the building's height and strengthening the superstructure.

History

Development 
In 1946, real estate developer William Zeckendorf purchased a site on First Avenue with the intention of creating a development called "X City", but he could not secure funding for the development. At the time, the UN was operating out of a temporary headquarters in Lake Success, New York, although it wished to build a permanent headquarters in the US. Several cities competed to host the UN headquarters before New York City was selected. John D. Rockefeller Jr. paid US$8.5 million for an option on the X City site, and he donated it to the UN in December 1946. The UN accepted this donation, despite the objections of several prominent architects such as Le Corbusier. The UN hired planning director Wallace Harrison, of the firm Harrison & Abramovitz, to lead the headquarters' design. He was assisted by a Board of Design composed of ten architects.

Planning 

The design process for the United Nations headquarters formally began in February 1947. Each architect on the Board of Design devised his own plan for the site, and some architects created several schemes. All the plans had to include at least three buildings: one each for the General Assembly, the Secretariat, and conference rooms. The plans had to comply with several "basic principles"; for example, the Secretariat Building was to be a 40-story tower without setbacks. It would be a freestanding tower surrounded by shorter structures, something which may have been influenced by Le Corbusier's ideals. Early designs called for the Secretariat tower to accommodate 2,300 workers; the architects subsequently considered a 5,265-worker capacity before finalizing the capacity at 4,000 workers. The tower was to be placed at the south end of the complex because it was near 42nd Street, a major crosstown street, and because the underlying bedrock was shallowest at this end.

By March 1947, the architects had devised preliminary sketches for the headquarters. The same month, the Board of Design published two alternative designs for a five-building complex, anchored by the Secretariat Building to the south and a pair of 35-story buildings to the north. After much discussion, Harrison decided to select a design based on the proposals of two board members, Oscar Niemeyer and Le Corbusier. Even though the design process was a collaborative effort, Le Corbusier took all the credit, saying the buildings were "100% the architecture and urbanism of Le Corbusier". The Board of Design presented their final plans for the United Nations headquarters in May 1947. The plans called for a 45-story Secretariat tower at the south end of the site, a 30-story office building at the north end, and several low-rise structures (including the General Assembly Building) in between. The committee unanimously agreed on this plan.

The Secretariat tower was planned to be the first building on the site, and it was initially projected to be finished in late 1948. The project was facing delays by mid-1947, when a slaughterhouse operator on the site requested that it be allowed to stay for several months. The complex was originally planned to cost US$85 million. Demolition of the site started in July 1947. The same month, UN Secretary-General Trygve Lie and the architects began discussing ways to reduce construction costs by downsizing the headquarters. Lie then submitted a report to the General Assembly in which he recommended reducing the Secretariat tower from 45 to 39 stories. The UN had contemplated installing a swimming pool in the building during the planning process, but the pool was eliminated due to objections from American media organizations. The General Assembly voted to approve the design for the headquarters in November 1947. By the next month, the architects were considering adding granite panels to the western elevation of the facade, since sunlight would enter through that facade during the majority of the workday.

Construction 
In April 1948, U.S. President Harry S. Truman requested that the United States Congress approve an interest-free loan of US$65 million to fund construction. Because Congress did not approve the loan for several months, there was uncertainty over whether the project would proceed. Around that time, the UN had decided to reduce the Secretariat Building to 39 stories. This, along with other modifications, was expected to save US$3 million. Congress authorized the loan in August 1948, of which US$25 million was made available immediately from the Reconstruction Finance Corporation. Lie predicted the US$25 million advance would only be sufficient to pay for the Secretariat Building's construction. To ensure that the project would remain within its US$65 million budget, Lie delayed the installation of the building's furnishings. thereby saving US$400,000.

The groundbreaking ceremony for the initial buildings occurred on September 14, 1948. A bucket of earth was removed to mark the start of construction for the basement of the Secretariat Building. The next month, Harrison requested that its 58 members and the 48 U.S. states participate in designing the interiors of the building's conference rooms. It was believed that if enough countries designed their own rooms, the UN would be able to reduce its own expenditures. Also in October, the American Bridge Company was hired to construct the steel superstructure of the Secretariat Building. Le Corbusier insisted that the facade of the Secretariat Building contain brises soleil, or sun-breakers, even as Harrison argued that the feature would not only be expensive but also difficult to clean during the winter. This prompted the architects to erect a mockup of the planned facade on the roof of the nearby Manhattan Building. By late 1948, the Secretariat Building was scheduled to receive its first tenants in 1950.

Fuller Turner Walsh Slattery Inc., a joint venture between the George A. Fuller Company, Turner Construction, the Walsh Construction Company, and the Slattery Contracting Company, was selected in December 1948 to construct the Secretariat Building, as well as the foundations for the remaining buildings. The next month, the UN formally awarded a US$23.8 million contract for the Secretariat Building's construction to the joint venture. The Secretariat Building was to be completed no later than January 1, 1951, or the joint venture would pay a minimum penalty of US$2,500 per day to the UN. The joint venture had started constructing the piers under the building by the end of January 1949, and site excavations were completed the next month. In April 1949, workers erected the first steel beam for the Secretariat Building, and the flag of the United Nations was raised above the first beam. The cornerstone of the headquarters was originally supposed to be laid at the Secretariat Building on April 10, 1949. Lie delayed the ceremony after learning that Truman would not present to officiate the cornerstone laying. The cornerstone was held in a storage yard in Maspeth, Queens, in the meantime.

The Secretariat Building's steel structure had been completed by October 1949. At a topping out ceremony on October 5, the UN flag was hoisted atop the roof of the newly completed steel frame. The facade was still not completed; the aluminum had only reached the 18th floor and the glass had reached the 9th floor. Six days later, Truman accepted an invitation to the cornerstone-laying ceremony. New York Governor Thomas E. Dewey laid the headquarters' cornerstone on October 24, 1949, the fourth anniversary of the United Nations' founding. Construction workers completed a sample office on the eighth floor in January 1950. By that June, the building was 80 percent completed, and the first occupants were scheduled to move there within two or three months. The southern half of the parking lot, underneath the Secretariat Building, was also finished; the northern half was being completed as part of the General Assembly Building. The building as a whole was not planned to be completed until January 1951.

Completion and early years

Opening 

The first portion of the building to be completed was its parking lot, which opened in July 1950. Staff started moving into the Secretariat on August 21, 1950, with 450 staff members moving into the basement levels and the first 15 stories. Staff members with frequent meetings, such as interpreters, remained at the Lake Success office for the time being. The lobby contained a temporary location for the UN's bookstore, which relocated to the General Assembly Building in 1952 following that structure's completion. At the time, the UN had 57 member states and could accommodate 13 more nations.

Initially, the UN did not allow visitors in the Secretariat Building. Shortly after the building opened, it was discovered that smoke from a nearby Consolidated Edison power plant was polluting the air intakes for the building's air conditioning system. The UN ultimately agreed in November 1950 to relocate the Secretariat Building's air intakes. The same month, the UN decided to spend US$360,000 to furnish three floors of offices for UNICEF and the Technical Assistance Administration. Media correspondents moved into the building in January 1951, and the Secretariat Building was fully occupied by that June. Building officials also announced in early 1951 that they would repair the windows, which were leaking due to poor weather-stripping. Officials had recorded 4,916 instances of leaks before the windows were repaired in mid-1951. During a storm that October, after the windows had been repaired, officials recorded only 16 leaks.

The building had 3,000 workers by the end of 1951. A Chicago Daily Tribune reporter said the staff were "neither united nor very peaceful", in part because staff tended to sit with those from their own countries. William R. Frye of The Christian Science Monitor said that the Secretariat Building's vertical office layout had led many staff members to express nostalgia for the old Lake Success offices. The Secretariat Building's cafeteria opened in January 1952, and the fountain outside the building was dedicated in June 1952. The Secretariat Building finally began receiving visitors that year, after the rest of the UN complex opened. By the end of 1952, the complex received about 1,500 visitors per day. Workers cleaned the building for the first time in April 1953, and repairs to the facade were completed by that September.

UN expansion 
The UN's membership expanded during the 1950s, prompting officials to expand the building's communications equipment in 1958. The next year, Secretary-General Dag Hammarskjöld proposed allocating US$635,000 to install automatic elevators in the Secretariat Building due to increasing labor costs. At that time, the building received about 2,500 to 3,000 tourists a day.

By 1962, the Secretariat Building was occupied by 3,000 Secretariat employees (three quarters of the total staff), as well as other UN organizations. That year Secretary-General U Thant proposed constructing a two-story annex at a cost of US$6.3 million, but a UN committee rejected this proposal. A journalists' club in the building was opened the same year. In 1964, a UN panel approved a proposal to replace the elevators and renovate two of the building's unoccupied stories, but it rejected other proposals to expand the headquarters. Two years later, Thant proposed constructing another office building within the UN headquarters. By then, the Secretariat Building was nearing capacity, and some organizations such as UNICEF had been forced to relocate. The building's manual elevators were replaced by automatic cabs in 1967.

Yet another expansion of the UN headquarters, including a park connected with the Secretariat Building, was proposed in 1968. This led to the construction of One United Nations Plaza, on 44th Street just outside the UN complex, in 1975. The main headquarters was expanded slightly from 1978 to 1981. As part of this project, a new cafeteria was built at the northern end of the headquarters, and the Secretariat Building's cafeteria had been converted into additional offices. Another office tower outside the headquarters proper, Two United Nations Plaza, was completed in 1983. By then, the Secretariat had over 6,000 employees, some of whom were forced to work within the United Nations Plaza towers. The new buildings were barely sufficient to accommodate the UN's demand for office space; the organization itself had expanded to 140 members by the 1970s. Furthermore, the Secretariat Building's tenant list had largely remained constant from its opening through the end of the 20th century. As a result, the building housed several departments that had existed since the 1950s but were unrelated to the Secretariat. Newer Secretariat departments occupied space in nearby office buildings rather than in the Secretariat Building.

Maintenance issues and renovation proposals 
Due to funding shortfalls in the 1980s, the UN diverted funding from its headquarters' maintenance fund to peacekeeping missions and other activities. The Secretariat Building's heating and cooling costs alone amounted to US$10 million a year. Because the headquarters was extraterritorial territory, the Secretariat Building was exempt from various building regulations. Furthermore, the building's machinery created electromagnetic fields, which reportedly made some employees ill. Although the General Assembly had voted to fund the installation of electromagnetic shields in the building in 1990, that money was instead used for roof repairs.

By 1998, the building had become technologically dated, and UN officials considered renovating the headquarters. The Secretariat Building did not meet modern New York City building regulations: it lacked a sprinkler system, the space leaked extensively, and there were large amounts of asbestos that needed to be removed. The mechanical systems were so outdated that the UN had to manufacture its own replacement parts, and up to one quarter of the building's heat escaped through leaks in the curtain wall. The building used massive amounts of energy because, at the time of the tower's construction, the UN had not been as concerned about energy conservation. Part of one story had been vacated because of interference from electromagnetic fields. The New York Times wrote that "if the United Nations had to abide by city building regulations [...] it might well be shuttered". At the time, the UN had proposed renovating the building for $800 million, as UN officials had concluded that the long-term cost of renovations would be cheaper than doing nothing.

The UN commissioned a report from engineering firm Ove Arup & Partners, which published its findings in 2000. The report recommended renovating the UN headquarters over a six-year period and adding ten stories to the Secretariat Building. Several options for renovating the UN headquarters were presented. The most expensive alternative, costing $245 million, called for the Secretariat Building to be rebuilt in several phases, requiring the relocation of one-third of the building's staff. Another option would have cost only $74 million and would have entailed the construction of several smaller office buildings. The UN could not secure funding for the project at the time. Following the September 11 attacks in 2001, the Secretariat Building's curtain walls were covered with a green coating, which was intended to limit damage in case of a bombing. In 2002, Secretary-General Kofi Annan proposed replacing the Robert Moses Playground with a new tower, relocating the Secretariat's offices there temporarily, and renovating the Secretariat Building itself. The UN selected Fumihiko Maki to design a building on the Moses site, but the New York State Legislature refused to pass legislation in 2005 that would have allowed these plans to proceed.

The UN then decided to renovate its existing structures over a seven-year period for US$1.6 billion. The Secretariat Building would be renovated in four phases, each covering ten stories, and the UN would lease an equivalent amount of office space nearby. Louis Frederick Reuter IV originally designed the renovation, but he resigned in 2006 following various disputes between UN and US officials. Michael Adlerstein was hired as the new project architect. Engineering firm Skanska was hired to renovate the Secretariat, Conference, and General Assembly buildings in July 2007. At that point, the cost of the project had risen to US$1.9 billion. Prior to the start of the renovation, in 2008, Secretary-General Ban Ki-moon approved a pilot program to reduce heat emissions by raising temperatures throughout the building. By then, the offices had been rearranged so frequently that the heating and cooling system no longer worked as intended.

Substantial renovation and reopening 
The renovation of the United Nations headquarters formally began in 2008. Adlerstein planned to reconstruct the Secretariat Building's offices entirely while preserving the appearance of the exterior and public spaces. All of the building's 5,000 workers had to relocate to nearby office space. Work on the building began in mid-2010. The work involved redesigning the mechanical systems, adding blast protection, and upgrading the building to conform to New York City building codes. In addition, large amounts of asbestos were removed from the structure, and workers installed a fire-alarm and sprinkler system. The curtain wall was also rebuilt in several sections, starting from the lowest levels and working upward. The building was also retrofitted with various green building features as part of the project.

The building reopened in phases, with the first workers returning in July 2012. On October 29, 2012, the basement of the UN complex was flooded due to Hurricane Sandy, leading to a three-day closure and the relocation of several offices. By that December, the last workers had moved back into the Secretariat Building. Following the renovation, the Secretariat Building housed all of the Secretariat's divisions. Some of the building's previous occupants, such as the Department of Peace Operations, had relocated to other buildings. In 2019, due to a budget shortfall, the UN curtailed heating and air-conditioning service in the building, and it shut down some of the Secretariat Building's escalators.

Impact

When the Secretariat Building was being constructed in June 1949, Building magazine described the tower as "a vast marble frame for two enormous windows ... a mosaic reflecting the sky from a thousand facets". Newsweek characterized the structure as being "a cross between Hiroshima, an Erector set, and a glazier's dream house". Upon the building's completion in 1951, Office Management and Equipment magazine presented UN officials with a plaque recognizing the building as "office of the year". The Secretariat Building's staff quickly nicknamed it the "Glass House".

Following the building's completion, it received a significant amount of architectural commentary, though reviews were mixed. Vogue magazine compared the tower to an "ice-cream sandwich", describing it as being "as much monument as office". Time magazine wrote: "Some architectural critics have called the Secretariat everything from a 'magnified radio console' to 'a sandwich on end'." The architect Henry Stern Churchill wrote of the building: "Visually it completely dominates the group; when one thinks of U.N. one thinks only of the vast green-glass, marble-end slab." Architectural Forum wrote: "Not since Lord Carnarvon discovered King Tut's Tomb in 1922 had a building caused such a stir." The architect Aaron Betsky wrote in 2005: "The Secretariat becomes both an abstraction of the office grids behind it and an abstract painting itself, posed in front of Manhattan as one approaches from the major airports on Long Island."

Some critics had negative views of the building. British architect Giles Gilbert Scott described the Secretariat Building as "that soapbox", saying: "I don't know whether that's architecture." Architectural critic Lewis Mumford regarded the building as a "superficial aesthetic triumph and an architectural failure" that was only enlivened during the nighttime, when the offices were illuminated. He wrote of the interiors: "So far from the being the model office building it might have been, it really is a very conventional job." Mumford reluctantly acknowledged that the building could be a global symbol, saying that the building represented the fact that "the managerial revolution has taken place and that bureaucracy rules the world".

The building's style has inspired the construction of other glass-walled buildings in Manhattan, such as Lever House, the Corning Glass Building, and the Springs Mills Building. The development of Lever House and the glass-walled Seagram Building, in turn, led to development of other glass-walled skyscrapers worldwide. Additionally, One United Nations Plaza was designed to complement the style of the Secretariat Building. The Secretariat Building and its connected structures have been depicted in numerous films such as The Glass Wall (1953) and North by Northwest (1959). The 2005 film The Interpreter was the first to actually be filmed inside the headquarters.

See also
 List of tallest buildings in New York City
 United Nations in popular culture

References

Notes

Citations

Sources

External links 

UN Visitors Centre

1951 establishments in New York City
Buildings associated with the Rockefeller family
Harrison & Abramovitz buildings
Headquarters of the United Nations
Le Corbusier buildings
Modernist architecture in New York City
Office buildings completed in 1951
Oscar Niemeyer buildings
Skyscraper office buildings in Manhattan
Turtle Bay, Manhattan
Building